King Lori (stylized in all caps) is the debut studio album by Swiss-Albanian rapper Loredana released on 13 September 2019 by Groove Attack. The production and writing process for the record was mostly handled by Loredana herself alongside Macloud and Miksu with LEE, Mr. Finch and Tilia providing additional production.

Track listing 
Credits adapted from Tidal.

Charts

Weekly charts

Year-end charts

Release history

References 

Loredana Zefi albums
2019 debut albums